Kalogeroi are three small uninhabited Greek islets in the Aegean Sea. They have been known both as Kalogeroi of Andros and Kalogeroi of Chios. The islets are situated 24 nautical miles southwest from Antipsara. Administratively they belong to Psara.

The island was the site of a Christian monastery as attested by various travellers to the Aegean.

References

Islands of the North Aegean
Uninhabited islands of Greece